United States gubernatorial elections were held on 3 November 1925, in two states. Virginia holds its gubernatorial elections in odd numbered years, every 4 years, following the United States presidential election year. New Jersey at this time held gubernatorial elections every 3 years, which it would abandon in 1949.

Results

References

 
November 1925 events